Chinn Glacier is a glacier  long on the south side of Mount Theseus in the Olympus Range, McMurdo Dry Valleys, Antarctica. A hanging glacier, it terminates on the north wall of Wright Valley. It was named by the New Zealand Geographic Board (1998) after Trevor Chinn of the Institute of Geological and Nuclear Sciences Limited, Christchurch, New Zealand, a glaciologist in McMurdo Dry Valleys for several seasons in the period 1974–93.

References
 

Glaciers of Victoria Land
Scott Coast